Hypotrachyna osseoalba, commonly known as the grainy loop lichen, is a species of foliose lichen in the family Parmeliaceae. It is widely distributed in subtropical and temperate areas of the world. Characteristic features of the lichen include the pustules in its cortex, the somewhat linear shape of the lobes comprising the thallus, and the branched rhizines (holdfasts on the thallus underside).

Taxonomy

It was first scientifically described by Finnish lichenologist Edvard Vainio in 1921, as Parmelia osseoalba. Yun Sil Park and Mason Hale transferred it to the genus Hypotrachyna in 1989.

The taxon Parmelia formosana, described by Alexander Zahlbruckner in 1934, later became Hypotrachyna formosana after Hale transferred it to Hypotrachyna in 1975. When Hale was later working on a monograph of genus Xanthoparmelia, he studied the type material of Vainio's Parmelia osseoalba, and determined that it was identical both chemically and morphologically to Hypotrachyna formosana. Because of this, the name used by Zahlbruckner became a later synonym of Vainio's name.

In North America, Hypotrachyna osseoalba is commonly known as the "grainy loop lichen".

Chemistry
Several secondary compounds are known to occur in Hypotrachyna osseoalba, including colensoinic acid, norcolensoic acid, physodic acid, lividic acid, 4-O-demethylphysodic acid, oxyphysodic acid, and lichexanthone.

Distribution
Hypotrachyna osseoalba occurs in subtropical and temperate areas of Asia (South Korea, Japan, Taiwan, and Thailand) Australia, Africa, Central America, South America, and the eastern United States.

References

osseoalba
Lichen species
Lichens described in 1921
Lichens of Asia
Lichens of Africa
Lichens of Australia
Lichens of Central America
Lichens of North America
Lichens of South America
Taxa named by Edvard August Vainio